Rahul Deshpande is an Indian classical music singer. He is the recipient of the 68th national award of the best playback singer for Me Vasantrao. He is the grandson of Vasantrao Deshpande.

Early life 
Rahul Deshpande was born on 10 October 1979 in Pune, Maharashtra.

Education and career
Rahul developed his interest in vocal music by studying the music of Kumar Gandharva. Initially, he sought guidance of Pandit Gangadharbuva :File:Rahul_Deshpande_singing_in_Vasantotsav_2010.jpg Pimpalkhare and Dr. Madhusudhan Patwardhan. He further learnt under the tutelage of Smt. Ushatai Chipalkatti and Pandit Mukul Shivputra. He also learned the tabla from Suresh Samant. His repertoire includes khayal, tap khayal, dhruvpad, thumri, kajri, hori, tappa, ghazal, abhanga, bhajan, natyasangeet and bhavgeet.
Rahul has judged Zee Marathi's popular reality TV show "Sa Re Ga Ma Pa - Little Champs" and Zee Yuva's "Sangeet Samrat parva2". His work in the re-opening of the musical play Katyar Kaljat Ghusali was appreciated. He was the playback singer for the songs of "Khansaheb Aftab Hussain Bareliwale", played by Sachin Pilgaonkar in the film. The role was played by Rahul himself in the play Katyar Kaljat Ghusali.

Also, every year he arranges the "Vasantotsav" in the memory of his late grandfather Pandit Vasantrao Deshpande.

A revised version of Kakasaheb Khadilkar's Sangeet Maanapmaan played in Maharashtra in 2011 and 2012, the centenary year of the play's first performance. It has been revised by Rahul Deshpande. "Originally, the play has five parts with around 52 classical songs. Deshpande's version will have two parts and 22 classical songs."

Stage appearances 

 Katyar Kaljat Ghusali
 Sangeet Sanshaykallol
 "Sangeet Manapman"
 "Sangeet Saubhadra"

Filmography 
 Balgandharva (Playback Singer)
 Katyar Kaljat Ghusali (Playback Singer)
 Amaltash (Actor and Playback Singer) (released)
 Me Vasantrao (Actor, as his grandfather and Playback Singer) (released)

Achievements and recognition
 Rasikagrani Dattopant Deshpande Award, presented to him at the Sawai Gandharva Music Festival.
 Master Dinanath Mangeshkar Awards 2012 by Lata Mangeshkar.
 "Kothrud Bhushan" award by the hands of Maharashtra's Chief Minister, Devendra Phadanvis.
 Sudhir Phadke Award for his outstanding achievements at a young age.
 Special Jury Award Best Singers in Zee Chitr Gaurav 2016.
 National Film Award for Best Male Playback Singer for Me Vasantrao (2022)
 Fakt Marathi Cine Sanman for Best Music Director for "Punav Raticha" – Me Vasantrao

Personal life
Rahul is married to Neha Deshpande and they have a daughter.

References

External links

 

Hindustani singers
Living people
Singers from Pune
Indian Hindus
Marathi-language singers
Patiala gharana
20th-century Khyal singers
1979 births
Best Male Playback Singer National Film Award winners